Edward S. Cameron (1895 – after 1933) was a Scottish professional footballer who made 139 appearances in the Football League playing for Birmingham, Walsall, Nelson and Exeter City. He played as a forward.

Career
Cameron was born in Glasgow. He began his football career with Clydebank before moving to England to sign for Birmingham in July 1921. Described as "a burly Scot ... never a great goalscorer, but a player who 'employed direct methods'", Cameron made his debut in the First Division on 29 August 1921 in a 2–1 win away at Chelsea. He played five more times, scoring once, but was allowed to leave for Walsall at the end of the 1921–22 season. He played regularly for the club for a little less than two years, then moved up to Nelson of the Second Division in March 1922. Unable to prevent their relegation that season, he contributed to their immediate promotion back to the Second Division in 1924–25.

In 1926 he joined Stafford Rangers, where his prolific goalscoring helped them to the championship of the Birmingham & District League in the 1926–27 season, and helped him earn a return to the Football League with Exeter City. He scored nine goals from 24 Third Division South games – completing his set of all four Football League divisions played in – before an unsuccessful trial at former club Nelson preceded a return to Stafford Rangers and a runners-up medal in 1929–30. He then won his second Birmingham & District League title, this time with Cradley Heath, and scored goals for Hednesford Town, before finishing off his career with yet another return to Stafford Rangers.

References

1895 births
Year of death missing
Footballers from Glasgow
Scottish footballers
Association football forwards
Clydebank F.C. (1914) players
Birmingham City F.C. players
Walsall F.C. players
Nelson F.C. players
Stafford Rangers F.C. players
Exeter City F.C. players
Cradley Heath F.C. players
Hednesford Town F.C. players
English Football League players
Date of birth missing